

Belgium
 Schouwburgplein in Kortrijk

The Netherlands
 Schouwburgplein in Rotterdam